An airport is an aerodrome with facilities for flights to take off and land. Airports often have facilities to store and maintain aircraft, and a control tower. An airport consists of a landing area, which comprises an aerially accessible open space including at least one operationally active surface such as a runway for a plane to take off or a helipad, and often includes adjacent utility buildings such as control towers, hangars and terminals.

An airport with a helipad for rotorcraft but no runway is called a heliport. An airport for use by seaplanes and amphibious aircraft is called a seaplane base. Such a base typically includes a stretch of open water for takeoffs and landings, and seaplane docks for tying-up.

An international airport has additional facilities for customs and immigration.

 By country: see :Category:Lists of airports by country
 By metropolitan area: see :Category:Airports by city
 List of eponyms of airports (airports named after people)
 Lists of military installations
 Lists of the World's busiest airports:
 by aircraft movements
 by cargo traffic
 by passenger traffic
 by international passenger traffic
 Lists by elevation:
 List of highest airports
 List of lowest airports
 With triple takeoff/landing capability
 Worldwide list of airports with scheduled commercial service, see: Airline destinations

See also 
 List of airports in Australia
 List of airports in the United States
 List of cities with more than one commercial airport
 List of IATA-indexed railway stations
 Lists of ports
 Seaport

Airports by continent 
 List of airports in Africa
 List of airports in Antarctica
 List of airports in Asia
 List of airports in Europe
 List of airports in North America
 List of airports in Oceania
 List of airports in South America

External links 
 KML (Google Earth geolocations) file of Airports